Nathan Yellin-Mor (Nathan Friedman-Yellin; 28 June 1913 – 18 February 1980) was a Revisionist Zionist activist, Lehi leader and Israeli politician.  In later years, he became a leader of the Israeli peace camp, a pacifist who supported negotiations with the Palestine Liberation Organization and concessions in the Israeli-Arab conflict.

Biography

Nathan Friedman-Yellin was born in Grodno in the Russian Empire (now Belarus). He studied engineering at the Warsaw Polytechnic. He was active in Betar and Irgun in Poland.

Between 1938 and 1939 he was the coeditor, along with Avraham Stern (Yair), of Di Tat ("The Action "), the Irgun's newspaper in Poland.

Zionist activism
He immigrated clandestinely to the British Mandate of Palestine and joined Lehi, a Jewish paramilitary group, Lohamei Herut Yisrael (Hebrew acronym LHI - in English, Fighters for the Freedom of Israel; derogatorily called by the British the Stern gang).
In December 1941, Yair Stern assigned Yellin-Mor to travel to Turkey and the Balkans to recruit Jews living there for the underground in Palestine. He was arrested near Aleppo, Syria and brought back to Palestine, where he was put into detention by the British first at the Mizrah detention camp and then transferred to Latrun. There Yellin-Mor masterminded digging a 74 meters long tunnel, and together with 19 comrades, escaped in 1943. After Stern's murder, he became a member of the Lehi's guiding triumvirate, with Israel Eldad as chief of Lehi's propaganda and Yitzhak Shamir as chief of operations . Yellin-Mor was in charge of Lehi's political activities.

He was one of the planners of the assassination of Lord Moyne. He saw the struggle against the British in an international context, and advocated collaboration with other anti-colonialist forces, including Palestinian and other Arab forces. After the Deir Yassin massacre, he privately confronted Eldad.
After the assassination in September 1948 of United Nations mediator Count Folke Bernadotte, he was arrested along with Lehi member Matityahu Shmuelevitch and charged with leadership of a terrorist organization. They were found guilty on January 25, 1949, the day on which Yellin-Mor was elected to the Knesset. On February 10, 1949, Yellin-Mor was sentenced to 8 years imprisonment. Though the court was confident that Lehi was responsible for Bernadotte's death, it did not find sufficient evidence that the murder had been sanctioned by the Lehi leadership. The court offered to release the defendants if they agreed to certain conditions that included forswearing underground activity and submitting to police supervision, but they rejected the offer.  However the Provisional State Council soon authorised their pardon.

Political career
In 1948 Yellin-Mor formed a political party, the Fighters List, and was elected to the first Knesset. He served from 1949 to 1951 and was a member of the Internal Affairs committee.

In 1949, he denounced the Partition of Palestine as "bartering with the territory of the homeland" and opposed the Palestinian right of return. Later, he moved increasingly to the left, in a return to the pro-Soviet position of some Lehi militants in the 1940s, by advocating a pro-Soviet foreign policy. In 1956 he helped found the group Semitic Action, whose journal Etgar ("Challenge") he edited.

In his later years, he dedicated himself to working for reconciliation with the Palestinians, promoting negotiations with the Palestine Liberation Organisation.

Published works

References

Further reading

External links

1913 births
1980 deaths
Belarusian Jews
Canaanites (movement)
Lehi (militant group)
Fighters' List politicians
Polish emigrants to Mandatory Palestine
People from Grodno
Members of the 1st Knesset (1949–1951)
Betar members
Israeli Peace Camp